New Women's Music Sampler is a sampler album of alternative rock songs by artists on the San Francisco, California based lesbian-feminist independent record label, Mr. Lady Records. It was released in October 1999.  A second sampler was released in 2001, entitled Calling All Kings & Queens.

Track listing 
The Moves: "Heavenly Creatures"  –  3:29  
The Need: "Girl Flavor Gum"  –  1:55  
The Butchies: "Sex (I'm a Lesbian)" –   3:03  
Retsin: "Pink River"  –  2:58  
Tami Hart: "Wait for Me Now" –   4:05  
Kittypryde & Her Shadowcats: "Dirt, Baby" –   2:24  
Tribe 8: "What the Paper's Didn't Say" –   2:22  
The Haggard: "Feminist Bullshit" –  2:52  
Sarah Dougher: "Fall Down"  –  3:21  
Doria Roberts: "Perfect" –  3:43  
Rubéo: "Movie Star"  –  2:38  
Kaia: "Insomnia" – 6:45

External links 
 [ Allmusic album entry]

Lesbian feminist mass media
Record label compilation albums
Women in music
1999 compilation albums